The 1963 ICF Canoe Slalom World Championships were held in Spittal, Austria under the auspices of International Canoe Federation. It was the 8th edition. The women's folding K1 team event resumed after being absent from the program at 1961 championships.

Medal summary

Men's

Canoe

Kayak

Mixed

Canoe

Women's

Kayak

Medals table

References

External links
International Canoe Federation

1963 in Austrian sport
1963 in canoeing
1963
International sports competitions hosted by Austria